Tytus Kanik (born 17 May 1984) is a Polish professional darts player and former pool player. Currently plays in World Darts Federation (WDF) events. He is a two-time Polish Champion and first player from Poland to gain a PDC Tour Card and make professional.

Career
He achieved his first sports success in pool games. In 2003, he won a bronze medal in the eight-ball Polish Billiards Championships. He also started playing darts around the same period, ultimately changing the sports discipline before 2014.

Very good performances at the national area, including plays in the final of the 2014 Polish Championship, where he lost to Krzysztof Chmielewski, allowed him to gain an official invitation to the 2015 PDC World Cup of Darts where he represented Poland together with Mariusz Paul, another leading player in the country at this time. In the first round of this tournament they faced the representation of Ireland, composed of William O'Connor and Connie Finnan and lost 0–5 in legs. In the first half of 2016, he advanced to the final of the Polish Championship for the second time, where he lost to Krzysztof Ratajski. Appearance in that phase of this tournament allowed him to debut in the 2016 Winmau World Masters, where he lost 0-3 in sets to Neil Duff in the second round match.

In May 2017, he became the Polish Champion for the first time, defeating Paweł Wołynka in the final. Victory in this tournament and numerous successes in the other national competitions resulted in his second invitation at 2017 PDC World Cup of Darts. This time he represented Poland together with Krzysztof Ratajski. Yet again, they played in first round with Ireland, this time composed of William O'Connor and Mick McGowan, and were defeated 3–5 in legs. At the end of September 2017, he played at 2017 Winmau World Masters, where he reached third round, beating Scott Robertson and Matthew Dicken. In third round match he lost 0–3 in sets to James Russell.

In January 2018, he became the first Polish player to gain a two-year PDC Tour Card. He won the third day of European Q-School by defeating José Justicia 5–3 in the final. The following week, he won the qualifying tournaments for two PDC European Tour events. Two months later he played at 2018 European Darts Open, beating Jan Dekker 6–3 in the first round. Next day, he lost 2–6 to Simon Whitlock in the second round. In April 2018, he played at 2018 German Darts Open, where he was eliminated in the first round match, lost 2–6 to James Wade. At the beginning of June 2018, he played in the 2018 PDC World Cup of Darts with Krzysztof Ratajski. After a very even duel, the Poles lost 4–5 in legs to Northern Ireland representing by Brendan Dolan and Daryl Gurney.

In early March 2019, he made his debut in the 2019 UK Open, where he lost 0–6 to Yordi Meeuwisse in the second round match. Later that month, he played at 2019 German Darts Championship, where he lost 4–6 to Jamie Hughes in the first round. In May 2019, he played at 2019 Austrian Darts Open where he advanced first time to the third round phase, beating Dietmar Burger and Jonny Clayton. In the third round match he lost 5–6 to Peter Wright.

In June 2019, he played at 2019 PDC World Cup of Darts with Krzysztof Ratajski. Poland defeated the Czech Republic 5–2 in legs. In the second round they faced the Netherlands. Kanik played with Jermaine Wattimena and lost 1–4 in legs. Bearing in mind the loss of Krzysztof Ratajski in first second round match with Michael van Gerwen, Poles were eliminated. Due to the lack of outstanding results, Kanik lost his card at the end of the season. His best achievement in the Players Championship is a semi-finals at the tenth tournament in April 2019, where he lost to Gabriel Clemens.

In the next season, after losing his professional card, in October 2020 he played in the 2020 International Darts Open. In the first round match he faced Martin Schindler from the host country. Match ended with Kanik's defeat 1–6 in legs. In July 2022, for the second time in his career he became the Polish Champion, beating Sebastian Białecki 5–3 in legs. Victory in this tournament guaranteed him a start in the 2022 WDF Europe Cup. It will be his debut in this competition.

Performance timeline

References

External links

Living people
Polish darts players
Professional Darts Corporation former tour card holders
Sportspeople from Poznań
1984 births
PDC World Cup of Darts Polish team